Charles J. Winninger (May 26, 1884 – January 27, 1969) was an American stage and film actor, most often cast in comedies or musicals.

Life and career
Winninger was born in Athens, Wisconsin, the son of Rosalia (Grassler) and Franz Winninger. His parents were Austrian immigrants. He began as a vaudeville actor. His most famous stage role was as Cap'n Andy Hawks in the original production of Show Boat, the Jerome Kern/Oscar Hammerstein II musical classic, in 1927. He played the role in the 1932 stage revival and the 1936 film version of the show. He became so identified with the role and with his persona as a riverboat captain that he played several variations of the role, notably on the radio program Maxwell House Show Boat, which was clearly inspired by the Broadway musical.

Winninger's pre-Code film career includes Night Nurse, a 1931 drama about two girls being systematically starved to death by the family chauffeur. Winninger portrays a kindly physician who attempts to save the suffering children. After the film of Show Boat in 1936, Winninger appeared in 1936's Three Smart Girls (as the father of Deanna Durbin's character), 1937's Nothing Sacred (as the drunken doctor who misdiagnoses Carole Lombard's character), 1939's Destry Rides Again (as Wash, the sheriff), 1941's Ziegfeld Girl (as the father of Judy Garland's character), and 1945's State Fair (as Abel Frake). He returned to Broadway only once for the 1951 revival of Kern and Hammerstein's Music in the Air.

Winninger had the lead role in only one film, 1953's The Sun Shines Bright, John Ford's remake of Judge Priest. Winninger played the role that Will Rogers portrayed in 1934.

Winninger made a notable television appearance in 1954 in I Love Lucy as Barney Kurtz, the former vaudevillian partner of Fred Mertz (played by William Frawley) in an episode titled "Mertz and Kurtz". He made his last film in 1960.

Personal life
On November 12, 1912, Winninger married actress Blanche Ring. They were divorced on June 12, 1951. He married Gertrude Walker in 1951, which lasted until his death.

Winninger died in 1969 and is buried at Forest Lawn Memorial Park in Los Angeles.

Recognition 
In 1960, Winninger received a star on the Hollywood Walk of Fame for his radio contributions.

Filmography 

 Mister Flirt in Wrong (1915, Short) - Mr. Rawsberry
 Lizzie's Shattered Dreams (1915, Short) - 2nd Stranger from the City
 The Doomed Groom (1915, Short) - The Groom
 A September Mourning (1916, Short) - The Artist
 Pied Piper Malone (1924) - Louie - the Barber
 The Canadian (1926) - Pop Tyson
 Summer Bachelors (1926) - Preston Smith
 Soup to Nuts (1930) - Otto Schmidt
 Fighting Caravans (1931) - Marshall
 Bad Sister (1931) - Mr. Madison
 Gun Smoke (1931) - Tack Gillup
 God's Gift to Women (1931) - John Churchill
 Night Nurse (1931) - Dr. Bell
 Children of Dreams (1931) - Dr. Joe Thompson
 The Sin of Madelon Claudet (1931) - Photographer
 Flying High (1931) - Doctor Brown
 Husband's Holiday (1931) - Mr. Reid
 Social Register (1934) - Jonesie
 Show Boat (1936) - Cap'n Andy Hawks
 White Fang (1936) - Doc McFane
 Three Smart Girls (1936) - Judson Craig
 Woman Chases Man (1937) - B.J. Nolan
 Cafe Metropole (1937) - Joseph Ridgeway
 The Go Getter (1937) - Cappy Ricks
 You Can't Have Everything (1937) - Sam Gordon
 Nothing Sacred (1937) - Dr. Enoch Downer
 Every Day's a Holiday (1937) - Van Reighle Van Pelter Van Doon
 You're a Sweetheart (1937) - Cherokee Charlie
 Goodbye Broadway (1938) - Pat Malloy
 Hard to Get (1938) - Ben Richards
 Three Smart Girls Grow Up (1939) - Judson Craig
 Babes in Arms (1939) - Joe Moran
 Destry Rides Again (1939) - Washington Dimsdale
 Barricade (1939) - Samuel J. Cady
 If I Had My Way (1940) - Joe Johnson
 Beyond Tomorrow (1940) - Michael O'Brien
 My Love Came Back (1940) - Julius Malette
 Little Nellie Kelly (1940) - Michael Noonan
 Pot o' Gold (1941) - C.J. Haskell
 Ziegfeld Girl (1941) - 'Pop' Gallagher
 The Getaway (1941) - Dr. Josiah Glass
 My Life with Caroline (1941) - Bliss
 Mister Gardenia Jones (1942, Documentary short) - John Jones
 Friendly Enemies (1942) - Karl Pfeiffer
 Coney Island (1943) - Finnigan
 Hers to Hold (1943) - Judson Craig
 A Lady Takes a Chance (1943) - Waco
 Flesh and Fantasy (1943) - King Lamarr (Episode 3)
 Broadway Rhythm (1944) - Sam Demming
 Sunday Dinner for a Soldier (1944) - Dudley 'Granfeathers' Osborne
 Belle of the Yukon (1944) - Pop Candless
 State Fair (1945) - Abel Frake
 She Wouldn't Say Yes (1945) - Doctor Lane
 Lover Come Back (1946) - William 'Pa' Williams, Sr.
 Living in a Big Way (1947) - D. Rutherford Morgan
 Something in the Wind (1947) - Uncle Chester Read
 The Inside Story (1948) - Uncle Ed
 Give My Regards to Broadway (1948) - Albert Norwick
 Father Is a Bachelor (1950) - Professor Mordecai Ford
 Torpedo Alley (1952) - Oliver J. Peabody
 The Sun Shines Bright (1953) - Judge William Pittman Priest
 A Perilous Journey (1953) - Captain Eph Allan
 Champ for a Day (1953) - Pa Karlsen
 Those Were the Days (1953, TV Movie)
 Las Vegas Shakedown (1955) - Ernest Raff
 Raymie (1960) - R.J. Parsons
 The Miracle of the White Reindeer (1960) - Zoo Keeper

Radio appearances

References

External links

 
 

1884 births
1969 deaths
People from Athens, Wisconsin
Male actors from Wisconsin
American male stage actors
American male film actors
American male radio actors
Vaudeville performers
Deaths from sepsis
Burials at Forest Lawn Memorial Park (Hollywood Hills)
20th-century American male actors